Koenigia as described by Philibert Commerçon is a synonym of Dombeya.

Koenigia is a genus of plants in the family Polygonaceae. The genus Aconogonon has been merged into Koenigia.

Description
Species of Koenigia are annual or perennial herbaceous plants, growing from taproots. The flowers are arranged in terminal or axillary inflorescences. The flowers have pale tepals: white, greenish to yellowish white or pink. The seeds are borne in achenes that are usually brown or black in colour and not winged.

Taxonomy
The genus Koenigia was erected by Carl Linnaeus in 1767, initially for the type species Koenigia islandica. The boundaries between genera in the family Polygonaceae, and the relationships among them, have long been a problem. At one time, many species were placed in the genus Polygonum. Koenigia is placed in the subfamily Polygonoideae, tribe Persicarieae, whose taxonomic history has been described as "exceptionally convoluted, even by Polygonaceae standards".

A molecular phylogenetic study of the subfamily Polygonoideae in 2015 showed that the genus Koenigia was polyphyletic with respect to the genus Aconogonon. An earlier study had reached a similar conclusion, and had suggested that extra genera be created to maintain monophyletic taxa. The authors of the 2015 study preferred the alternative of merging the two genera, a proposal accepted by other sources. Using broad circumscriptions of the genera, the 2015 study suggested that relationships within the tribe Persicarieae were:

Species
, Plants of the World Online accepted the following species:

Koenigia alaskana (Small) T.M.Schust. & Reveal
Koenigia alpina (All.) T.M.Schust. & Reveal
Koenigia campanulata (Hook.f.) T.M.Schust. & Reveal
Koenigia cathayana (A.J.Li) T.M.Schust. & Reveal
Koenigia chuanzangensis Z.Z.Zhou & Y.J.Min
Koenigia coriaria (Grig.) T.M.Schust. & Reveal
Koenigia cyanandra (Diels) Mesícek & Soják
Koenigia davisiae (W.H.Brewer ex A.Gray) T.M.Schust. & Reveal
Koenigia delicatula (Meisn.) H.Hara
Koenigia divaricata (L.) T.M.Schust. & Reveal
Koenigia × fennica f(Reiersen) T.M.Schust. & Reveal
Koenigia fertilis Maxim.
Koenigia filicaulis (Wall. ex Meisn.) T.M.Schust. & Reveal
Koenigia forrestii (Diels) Mesícek & Soják
Koenigia hedbergii Bo Li & W.Du
Koenigia hookeri (Meisn.) T.M.Schust. & Reveal
Koenigia islandica L.
Koenigia jurii (A.K.Skvortsov) T.M.Schust. & Reveal
Koenigia lichiangensis (W.W.Sm.) T.M.Schust. & Reveal
Koenigia limosa (Kom.) T.M.Schust. & Reveal
Koenigia mollis (D.Don) T.M.Schust. & Reveal
Koenigia nepalensis D.Don
Koenigia nummularifolia (Meisn.) Mesícek & Soják
Koenigia ocreata (L.) T.M.Schust. & Reveal
Koenigia panjutinii (Kharkev.) T.M.Schust. & Reveal
Koenigia phytolaccifolia (Meisn. ex Small) T.M.Schust. & Reveal
Koenigia pilosa Maxim.
Koenigia polystachya (Wall. ex Meisn.) T.M.Schust. & Reveal
Koenigia relicta (Kom.) T.M.Schust. & Reveal
Koenigia rumicifolia (Royle ex Bab.) T.M.Schust. & Reveal
Koenigia songarica (Schrenk) T.M.Schust. & Reveal
Koenigia tortuosa (D.Don) T.M.Schust. & Reveal
Koenigia tripterocarpa (A.Gray) T.M.Schust. & Reveal
Koenigia weyrichii (F.Schmidt) T.M.Schust. & Reveal
Koenigia yatagaiana (T.Mori) T.C.Hsu & S.W.Chung

Distribution and habitat
Koenigia species are found in meadows, along stream banks, or on rocky slopes in arctic, temperate and alpine regions of the Northern Hemisphere.

References

Polygonaceae genera
Polygonoideae
Taxa named by Carl Linnaeus